Edward Niño Hernández (born May 10, 1986) is the world's second shortest living mobile man. He was certified on September 4, 2010, by the Guinness World Records. He lives in Bogotá, Colombia.

The previous titleholder, He Pingping of Inner Mongolia, was  taller and died on March 13, 2010, in Rome, Italy, where he was filming the TV program Lo show dei record. Hernandez's reign ended on October 14, 2010, when Khagendra Thapa Magar of Nepal turned 18. He reclaimed the record following Magar's death on January 17, 2020, and lost it again on December 13, 2022, to Afshin Ghaderzadeh of Iran when he was aged 20.

He appeared on the TV programme Susana Giménez in Argentina.

See also
Dwarfism
Human height
List of people with dwarfism
List of shortest people

References

1986 births
Living people
People from Bogotá
People with dwarfism